Thomas Louis Bull (7 September 1905 – 11 August 1976) was an Australian politician. Born in Wagga Wagga, New South Wales, he was educated at Wesley College in Melbourne, after which he returned to New South Wales as a grazier in Narrandera. He was President of the Australian Woolgrowers and Graziers Council, 1962–1965, and was also a company director. In 1964, he was elected to the Australian Senate as a Country Party Senator for New South Wales, taking his seat in 1965. He was defeated in 1970, and died in 1976.

His son, Richard Bull, was later elected to the New South Wales Legislative Council.

References

National Party of Australia members of the Parliament of Australia
Members of the Australian Senate for New South Wales
Members of the Australian Senate
1905 births
1976 deaths
20th-century Australian politicians